Sebastián Paolo Galani Villega (born August 17, 1997) is a Chilean footballer who currently plays for Chilean Primera División club Coquimbo Unido as a midfielder.

Club career

Coquimbo Unido
On 13 August 2016, Galani made his professional debut in a match against Ñublense, playing ninety minutes, accomplishing consistency since the arrival of the coach Patricio Graff on 2017. After Coquimbo Unido won the 2018 Primera B and got promotion to Primera División, he joined to Universidad de Chile along with his teammate Diego Carrasco, but Galani stayed on loan at the pirate team for all 2019 season.

Universidad de Chile
On 2 January 2020, he was officially presented as Universidad de Chile player for 2020 season.

International career
Galani represented Chile U23 in a friendly match against Brazil U23 on September 9, 2019.

Career statistics

Club

Notes

Honours

Club
Coquimbo Unido
 Primera B: 2018

References

External links
 
 

Living people
1997 births
People from Coquimbo
Chilean footballers
Coquimbo Unido footballers
Universidad de Chile footballers
Club Deportivo Universidad Católica footballers
Primera B de Chile players
Chilean Primera División players
Association football midfielders